= No sharps =

No sharps may refer to:

- C major, a major musical key with no sharps
- A minor, a minor musical key with no sharps
